Fiza Farhan is a Pakistani social entrepreneur, business personality, activist and development expert analyst. She is the co-founder of Buksh Foundation and currently works as a Global Strategic Development advisor. She is a member of the UN Secretary-General's panel on Women's Economic Empowerment.

Farhan is known for creating awareness about energy conservation and female empowerment in Pakistan. She is also known for microfinance and energy project schemes.

Career 
Fiza Farhan started her career in 2008. She led the social enterprise Buksh Foundation as one of the youngest CEOs in the sector. 

She has also served as a director of Buksh Energy Limited, where she launched Pakistan’s first ESCO (energy service company) and was a pioneer in developing green financing consortiums for the private and public sectors. At the meso-level, she led the business teams of various multinational corporations in Pakistan to scale up to multiple innovations including Solar ATMs for commercial banks, solar milk chillers for dairy companies, and solar BTS for telecom companies. At the macro level, she has also initiated Pakistan’s first 10MW Solar Independent Power Plant (IPP) and has worked closely with the Government of Pakistan to develop policies on renewable energy.

She was the fourth Pakistani to appear on the Forbes 30 Under 30 List of Social Entrepreneurs and the first Pakistani to become a future energy leader at the World Energy Council.

In 2016, the UN Secretary-General appointed Fiza Farhan as a member of his first-ever high-level panel on women's economic empowerment amidst global leadership. Her journey advanced further when she was appointed as the chairperson to Chief Minister Punjab’s task force on women empowerment in Punjab (Pakistan’s largest province in terms of population) in March 2016. She became one of the youngest advisors to the UN Secretary-General and the Chief Minister of Punjab. At the same time, in July 2016, Fiza decided to evolve her professional career leaving behind Buksh Foundation & Buksh Energy to emerge as an independent global strategic development advisor working with multiple governments, UN agencies, development organizations, civil society, and the private sector in addressing key development agendas. This includes, but is not limited to, women's empowerment, climate change, energy access, sustainable growth, youth & education, and multi-sectorial partnerships.

Farhan wrote a memoir, 52 Pearls of Life, which was published in 2016. The book details her thoughts and her success as an activist.

Accolades 
•	Winner of “TIAW World of Difference Awards” at Royal Automobile Club of Australia on October 18, 2019

•	Selected in the Forbes Asia, “30 Under 30 List of Social Entrepreneurs” for 2016

•	Winner of the Education UK Alumni Awards, 2016 in the “Social Impact” Category

•	Received a complimentary membership for the Clinton Global Initiative 2015

•	Received “Poverty Alleviation Award” at the Asian Corporate Social Responsibility Forum, 2015 – Bangkok, Thailand

•	Featured as “Chand Sitara: Heroes of Pakistan” in the National song made by PEPSI Pakistan with title “Chamke Hum se Pakistan” on August 14, 2015

•	Selected in US Magazine “FORBES 30 Under 30 Social Entrepreneurs 2015 List”

References

External links
 Women’s Economic Participation and Empowerment in Pakistan - Status Report 201

Living people
Pakistani businesspeople
Pakistani women activists
Lahore University of Management Sciences alumni
1986 births